Freedom of speech is a principle that supports the freedom of an individual or a community to articulate their opinions and ideas without fear of retaliation, censorship, or legal sanction. The right to freedom of expression has been recognised as a human right in the Universal Declaration of Human Rights and international human rights law by the United Nations. Many countries have constitutional law that protects free speech. Terms like free speech, freedom of speech, and freedom of expression are used interchangeably in political discourse. However, in a legal sense, the freedom of expression includes any activity of seeking, receiving, and imparting information or ideas, regardless of the medium used.

Article 19 of the UDHR states that "everyone shall have the right to hold opinions without interference" and "everyone shall have the right to freedom of expression; this right shall include freedom to seek, receive, and impart information and ideas of all kinds, regardless of frontiers, either orally, in writing or in print, in the form of art, or through any other media of his choice". The version of Article 19 in the ICCPR later amends this by stating that the exercise of these rights carries "special duties and responsibilities" and may "therefore be subject to certain restrictions" when necessary "[f]or respect of the rights or reputation of others" or "[f]or the protection of national security or of public order (order public), or of public health or morals".

Freedom of speech and expression, therefore, may not be recognized as being absolute, and common limitations or boundaries to freedom of speech relate to libel, slander, obscenity, pornography, sedition, incitement, fighting words, hate speech, classified information, copyright violation, trade secrets, food labeling, non-disclosure agreements, the right to privacy, dignity, the right to be forgotten, public security, and perjury. Justifications for such include the harm principle, proposed by John Stuart Mill in On Liberty, which suggests that "the only purpose for which power can be rightfully exercised over any member of a civilized community, against his will, is to prevent harm to others".

The idea of the "offense principle" is also used to justify speech limitations, describing the restriction on forms of expression deemed offensive to society, considering factors such as extent, duration, motives of the speaker, and ease with which it could be avoided. With the evolution of the digital age, application of freedom of speech becomes more controversial as new means of communication and restrictions arise, for example, the Golden Shield Project, an initiative by Chinese government's Ministry of Public Security that filters potentially unfavourable data from foreign countries.

The Human Rights Measurement Initiative measures the right to opinion and expression for countries around the world, using a survey of in-country human rights experts.

Historical origins 
Freedom of speech and expression has a long history that predates modern international human rights instruments. It is thought that the ancient Athenian democratic principle of free speech may have emerged in the late 6th or early 5th century BC.

Freedom of speech was vindicated by Erasmus and Milton. Edward Coke claimed freedom of speech as "an ancient custom of Parliament" in the 1590s, and it was affirmed in the Protestation of 1621. England's Bill of Rights 1689 legally established the constitutional right of freedom of speech in Parliament which is still in effect, so-called parliamentary privilege.

One of the world's first freedom of the press acts was introduced in Sweden in 1766 (Swedish Freedom of the Press Act), mainly due to the classical liberal member of parliament and Ostrobothnian priest Anders Chydenius.  In a report published in 1776, he wrote:No evidence should be needed that a certain freedom of writing and printing is one of the strongest bulwarks of a free organization of the state, as, without it, the estates would not have sufficient information for the drafting of good laws, and those dispensing justice would not be monitored, nor would the subjects know the requirements of the law, the limits of the rights of government, and their responsibilities. Education and ethical conduct would be crushed; coarseness in thought, speech, and manners would prevail, and dimness would darken the entire sky of our freedom in a few years.Under the leadership of the Anders Chydenius, the Caps at the Swedish Riksdag in Gävle on December 2, 1766, passed the adoption of a freedom of the press regulation that stopped censorship and introduced the principle of public access to official records in the Swedish authority. Excluded were defamation of the king's majesty and the Swedish Church.

The Declaration of the Rights of Man and of the Citizen, adopted during the French Revolution in 1789, specifically affirmed freedom of speech as an inalienable right. Adopted in 1791, freedom of speech is a feature of the First Amendment to the United States Constitution. The French Declaration provides for freedom of expression in Article 11, which states that:

Article 19 of the Universal Declaration of Human Rights, adopted in 1948, states that:

Today, freedom of speech, or the freedom of expression, is recognised in international and regional human rights law. The right is enshrined in Article 19 of the International Covenant on Civil and Political Rights, Article 10 of the European Convention on Human Rights, Article 13 of the American Convention on Human Rights and Article 9 of the African Charter on Human and Peoples' Rights. Based on John Milton's arguments, freedom of speech is understood as a multi-faceted right that includes not only the right to express, or disseminate, information and ideas but three further distinct aspects:
 the right to seek information and ideas;
 the right to receive information and ideas;
 the right to impart information and ideas

International, regional and national standards also recognise that freedom of speech, as the freedom of expression, includes any medium, whether orally, in writing, in print, through the internet or art forms. This means that the protection of freedom of speech as a right includes the content and the means of expression.

Relationship to other rights 
The right to freedom of speech and expression is closely related to other rights. It may be limited when conflicting with other rights (see limitations on freedom of speech). The right to freedom of expression is also related to the right to a fair trial and court proceeding which may limit access to the search for information, or determine the opportunity and means in which freedom of expression is manifested within court proceedings. As a general principle freedom of expression may not limit the right to privacy, as well as the honor and reputation of others. However, greater latitude is given when criticism of public figures is involved.

The right to freedom of expression is particularly important for media, which plays a special role as the bearer of the general right to freedom of expression for all. However, freedom of the press does not necessarily enable freedom of speech. Judith Lichtenberg has outlined conditions in which freedom of the press may constrain freedom of speech. For example, if all the people who control the various mediums of publication suppress information or stifle the diversity of voices inherent in freedom of speech. This limitation was famously summarised as "Freedom of the press is guaranteed only to those who own one". Lichtenberg argues that freedom of the press is simply a form of property right summed up by the principle "no money, no voice".

As a negative right 
Freedom of speech is usually seen as a negative right. This means that the government is legally obliged to take no action against the speaker based on the speaker's views, but that no one is obliged to help any speakers publish their views, and no one is required to listen to, agree with, or acknowledge the speaker or the speaker's views.

Democracy in relation to social interaction 

Freedom of speech is understood to be fundamental in a democracy. The norms on limiting freedom of expression mean that public debate may not be completely suppressed even in times of emergency. One of the most notable proponents of the link between freedom of speech and democracy is Alexander Meiklejohn. He has argued that the concept of democracy is that of self-government by the people. For such a system to work, an informed electorate is necessary. In order to be appropriately knowledgeable, there must be no constraints on the free flow of information and ideas. According to Meiklejohn, democracy will not be true to its essential ideal if those in power can manipulate the electorate by withholding information and stifling criticism. Meiklejohn acknowledges that the desire to manipulate opinion can stem from the motive of seeking to benefit society. However, he argues, choosing manipulation negates, in its means, the democratic ideal.

Eric Barendt has called this defence of free speech on the grounds of democracy "probably the most attractive and certainly the most fashionable free speech theory in modern Western democracies". Thomas I. Emerson expanded on this defence when he argued that freedom of speech helps to provide a balance between stability and change. Freedom of speech acts as a "safety valve" to let off steam when people might otherwise be bent on revolution. He argues that "The principle of open discussion is a method of achieving a more adaptable and at the same time more stable community, of maintaining the precarious balance between healthy cleavage and necessary consensus". Emerson furthermore maintains that "Opposition serves a vital social function in offsetting or ameliorating (the) normal process of bureaucratic decay".

Research undertaken by the Worldwide Governance Indicators project at the World Bank, indicates that freedom of speech, and the process of accountability that follows it, have a significant impact on the quality of governance of a country. "Voice and Accountability" within a country, defined as "the extent to which a country's citizens are able to participate in selecting their government, as well as freedom of expression, freedom of association, and free media" is one of the six dimensions of governance that the Worldwide Governance Indicators measure for more than 200 countries. Against this backdrop it is important that development agencies create grounds for effective support for a free press in developing countries.

Richard Moon has developed the argument that the value of freedom of speech and freedom of expression lies with social interactions. Moon writes that "by communicating an individual forms relationships and associations with others – family, friends, co-workers, church congregation, and countrymen. By entering into discussion with others an individual participates in the development of knowledge and in the direction of the community".

Limitations 

Freedom of speech is not regarded as absolute by some, with most legal systems generally setting limits on the freedom of speech, particularly when freedom of speech conflicts with other rights and protections, such as in the cases of libel, slander, pornography, obscenity, fighting words, and intellectual property.

Some limitations to freedom of speech may occur through legal sanction, and others may occur through social disapprobation.

Harmful and offensive content 
Some views are illegal to express because they can cause harm to others. This category often includes speech that is both false and dangerous, such as falsely shouting "Fire!" in a theatre and causing a panic. Justifications for limitations to freedom of speech often reference the "harm principle" or the "offence principle".

In On Liberty (1859), John Stuart Mill argued that "...there ought to exist the fullest liberty of professing and discussing, as a matter of ethical conviction, any doctrine, however immoral it may be considered". Mill argues that the fullest liberty of expression is required to push arguments to their logical limits, rather than the limits of social embarrassment.

In 1985, Joel Feinberg introduced what is known as the "offence principle". Feinberg wrote, "It is always a good reason in support of a proposed criminal prohibition that it would probably be an effective way of preventing serious offence (as opposed to injury or harm) to persons other than the actor, and that it is probably a necessary means to that end". Hence Feinberg argues that the harm principle sets the bar too high and that some forms of expression can be legitimately prohibited by law because they are very offensive. Nevertheless, as offending someone is less serious than harming someone, the penalties imposed should be higher for causing harm. In contrast, Mill does not support legal penalties unless they are based on the harm principle. Because the degree to which people may take offence varies, or may be the result of unjustified prejudice, Feinberg suggests that several factors need to be taken into account when applying the offence principle, including: the extent, duration and social value of the speech, the ease with which it can be avoided, the motives of the speaker, the number of people offended, the intensity of the offence, and the general interest of the community at large.

Jasper Doomen argued that harm should be defined from the point of view of the individual citizen, not limiting harm to physical harm since nonphysical harm may also be involved; Feinberg's distinction between harm and offence is criticized as largely trivial.

In 1999, Bernard Harcourt wrote of the collapse of the harm principle: "Today the debate is characterized by a cacophony of competing harm arguments without any way to resolve them. There is no longer an argument within the structure of the debate to resolve the competing claims of harm. The original harm principle was never equipped to determine the relative importance of harms".

Interpretations of both the harm and offense limitations to freedom of speech are culturally and politically relative. For instance, in Russia, the harm and offense principles have been used to justify the Russian LGBT propaganda law restricting speech (and action) concerning LGBT issues. Many European countries that take pride in freedom of speech nevertheless outlaw speech that might be interpreted as Holocaust denial. These include Austria, Belgium, Canada, the Czech Republic, France, Germany, Hungary, Israel, Liechtenstein, Lithuania, Luxembourg, Netherlands, Poland, Portugal, Russia, Slovakia, Switzerland and Romania. Armenian genocide denial is also illegal in some countries.

In some countries, blasphemy is a crime. For example, in Austria, defaming Muhammad, the prophet of Islam, is not protected as free speech. In contrast, in France, blasphemy and disparagement of Muhammad are protected under free speech law.

Certain public institutions may also enact policies restricting the freedom of speech, for example, speech codes at state-operated schools.

In the U.S., the standing landmark opinion on political speech is Brandenburg v. Ohio (1969), expressly overruling Whitney v. California. In Brandenburg, the U.S. Supreme Court referred to the right even to speak openly of violent action and revolution in broad terms: The opinion in Brandenburg discarded the previous test of "clear and present danger" and made the right to freedom of (political) speech protections in the United States almost absolute. Hate speech is also protected by the First Amendment in the United States, as decided in R.A.V. v. City of St. Paul, (1992) in which the Supreme Court ruled that hate speech is permissible, except in the case of imminent violence. See the First Amendment to the United States Constitution for more detailed information on this decision and its historical background.

Time, place, and manner 

Limitations based on time, place, and manner apply to all speech, regardless of the view expressed. They are generally restrictions that are intended to balance other rights or a legitimate government interest. For example, a time, place, and manner restriction might prohibit a noisy political demonstration at a politician's home during the middle of the night, as that impinges upon the rights of the politician's neighbors to quiet enjoyment of their own homes. An otherwise identical activity might be permitted if it happened at a different time (e.g., during the day), at a different place (e.g., at a government building or in another public forum), or in a different manner (e.g., a silent protest).

The Internet and information society 

Jo Glanville, editor of the Index on Censorship, states that "the Internet has been a revolution for censorship as much as for free speech". International, national and regional standards recognise that freedom of speech, as one form of freedom of expression, applies to any medium, including the Internet. The Communications Decency Act (CDA) of 1996 was the first major attempt by the United States Congress to regulate pornographic material on the Internet. In 1997, in the landmark cyberlaw case of Reno v. ACLU, the US Supreme Court partially overturned the law. Judge Stewart R. Dalzell, one of the three federal judges who in June 1996 declared parts of the CDA unconstitutional, in his opinion stated the following:

The World Summit on the Information Society (WSIS) Declaration of Principles adopted in 2003 makes specific reference to the importance of the right to freedom of expression for the "Information Society" in stating:

According to Bernt Hugenholtz and Lucie Guibault, the public domain is under pressure from the "commodification of information" as information with previously little or no economic value has acquired independent economic value in the information age. This includes factual data, personal data, genetic information and pure ideas. The commodification of information is taking place through intellectual property law, contract law, as well as broadcasting and telecommunications law.

Freedom of information 

Freedom of information is an extension of freedom of speech where the medium of expression is the Internet. Freedom of information may also refer to the right to privacy in the context of the Internet and information technology. As with the right to freedom of expression, the right to privacy is a recognised human right and freedom of information acts as an extension to this right. Freedom of information may also concern censorship in an information technology context, i.e. the ability to access Web content, without censorship or restrictions.

Freedom of information is also explicitly protected by acts such as the Freedom of Information and Protection of Privacy Act of Ontario, in Canada. The Access to Information Act gives Canadian citizens, permanent residents, and any person or corporation present in Canada a right to access records of government institutions that are subject to the Act.

Internet censorship 

The concept of freedom of information has emerged in response to state sponsored censorship, monitoring and surveillance of the internet. Internet censorship includes the control or suppression of the publishing or accessing of information on the Internet. The Global Internet Freedom Consortium claims to remove blocks to the "free flow of information" for what they term "closed societies". According to the Reporters without Borders (RWB) "internet enemy list" the following states engage in pervasive internet censorship: Mainland China, Cuba, Iran, Myanmar/Burma, North Korea, Saudi Arabia, Syria, Turkmenistan, Uzbekistan, and Vietnam.

A widely publicized example of internet censorship is the "Great Firewall of China" (in reference both to its role as a network firewall and the ancient Great Wall of China). The system blocks content by preventing IP addresses from being routed through and consists of standard firewall and proxy servers at the internet gateways. The system also selectively engages in DNS poisoning when particular sites are requested. The government does not appear to be systematically examining Internet content, as this appears to be technically impractical. Internet censorship in the People's Republic of China is conducted under a wide variety of laws and administrative regulations, including more than sixty regulations directed at the Internet. Censorship systems are vigorously implemented by provincial branches of state-owned ISPs, business companies, and organizations.

Relationship with disinformation

Some legal scholars (such as Tim Wu of Columbia University) have argued that the traditional issues of free speech—that "the main threat to free speech" is the censorship of "suppressive states," and that "ill-informed or malevolent speech" can and should be overcome by "more and better speech" rather than censorship—assumes scarcity of information. This scarcity prevailed during the 20th century, but with the arrival of the internet, information became plentiful, "but the attention of listeners" scarce. Furthermore, in the words of Wu, this "cheap speech" made possible by the internet " ... may be used to attack, harass, and silence as much as it is used to illuminate or debate". The Electronic Frontier Foundation (EFF) has argued that "censorship cannot be the only answer to disinformation online" and that tech companies "have a history of overcorrecting and censoring accurate, useful speech—or, even worse, reinforcing misinformation with their policies."

According to Wu, in the 21st century, the danger is not "suppressive states" that target "speakers directly", but that

History of dissent and truth 

Before the invention of the printing press, a written work, once created, could only be physically multiplied by highly laborious and error-prone manual copying. No elaborate system of censorship and control over scribes existed, who until the 14th century were restricted to religious institutions, and their works rarely caused wider controversy. In response to the printing press, and the theological heresies it allowed to spread, the Roman Catholic Church moved to impose censorship. Printing allowed for multiple exact copies of a work, leading to a more rapid and widespread circulation of ideas and information (see print culture). The origins of copyright law in most European countries lie in efforts by the Roman Catholic Church and governments to regulate and control the output of printers.

In 1501, Pope Alexander VI issued a Bill against the unlicensed printing of books. In 1559, Pope Paul IV promulgated the Index Expurgatorius, or List of Prohibited Books. The Index Expurgatorius is the most famous and long-lasting example of "bad books" catalogues issued by the Roman Catholic Church, which presumed to be in authority over private thoughts and opinions, and suppressed views that went against its doctrines. The Index Expurgatorius was administered by the Roman Inquisition, but enforced by local government authorities, and went through 300 editions. Amongst others, it banned or censored books written by René Descartes, Giordano Bruno, Galileo Galilei, David Hume, John Locke, Daniel Defoe, Jean-Jacques Rousseau and Voltaire. While governments and church encouraged printing in many ways because it allowed for the dissemination of Bibles and government information, works of dissent and criticism could also circulate rapidly. Consequently, governments established controls over printers across Europe, requiring them to have official licenses to trade and produce books.

The notion that the expression of dissent or subversive views should be tolerated, not censured or punished by law, developed alongside the rise of printing and the press. Areopagitica, published in 1644, was John Milton's response to the Parliament of England's re-introduction of government licensing of printers, hence publishers. Church authorities had previously ensured that Milton's essay on the right to divorce was refused a license for publication. In Areopagitica, published without a license, Milton made an impassioned plea for freedom of expression and toleration of falsehood, stating:

Milton's defense of freedom of expression was grounded in a Protestant worldview. He thought that the English people had the mission to work out the truth of the Reformation, which would lead to the enlightenment of all people. Nevertheless, Milton also articulated the main strands of future discussions about freedom of expression. By defining the scope of freedom of expression and "harmful" speech, Milton argued against the principle of pre-censorship and in favor of tolerance for a wide range of views. Freedom of the press ceased being regulated in England in 1695 when the Licensing Order of 1643 was allowed to expire after the introduction of the Bill of Rights 1689 shortly after the Glorious Revolution. The emergence of publications like the Tatler (1709) and the Spectator (1711) are credited for creating a 'bourgeois public sphere' in England that allowed for a free exchange of ideas and information.

More governments attempted to centralize control as the "menace" of printing spread. The French crown repressed printing and the printer Etienne Dolet was burned at the stake in 1546. In 1557 the British Crown thought to stem the flow of seditious and heretical books by chartering the Stationers' Company. The right to print was limited to the members of that guild. Thirty years later, the Star Chamber was chartered to curtail the "greate enormities and abuses" of "dyvers contentyous and disorderlye persons professinge the arte or mystere of pryntinge or selling of books". The right to print was restricted to two universities and the 21 existing printers in the city of London, which had 53 printing presses. As the British crown took control of type founding in 1637, printers fled to the Netherlands. Confrontation with authority made printers radical and rebellious, with 800 authors, printers, and book dealers being incarcerated in the Bastille in Paris before it was stormed in 1789.

A succession of English thinkers was at the forefront of early discussion on a right to freedom of expression, among them John Milton (1608–74) and John Locke (1632–1704). Locke established the individual as the unit of value and the bearer of rights to life, liberty, property and the pursuit of happiness. However, Locke's ideas evolved primarily around the concept of the right to seek salvation for one's soul. He was thus primarily concerned with theological matters. Locke neither supported a universal toleration of peoples nor freedom of speech; according to his ideas, some groups, such as atheists, should not be allowed.

By the second half of the 17th century philosophers on the European continent like Baruch Spinoza and Pierre Bayle developed ideas encompassing a more universal aspect freedom of speech and toleration than the early English philosophers. By the 18th century the idea of freedom of speech was being discussed by thinkers all over the Western world, especially by French philosophes like Denis Diderot, Baron d'Holbach and Claude Adrien Helvétius. The idea began to be incorporated in political theory both in theory as well as practice; the first state edict in history proclaiming complete freedom of speech was the one issued 4 December 1770 in Denmark-Norway during the regency of Johann Friedrich Struensee. However Struensee himself imposed some minor limitations to this edict on 7 October 1771, and it was even further limited after the fall of Struensee with legislation introduced in 1773, although censorship was not reintroduced.

John Stuart Mill (1806–1873) argued that without human freedom, there could be no progress in science, law, or politics, which according to Mill, required free discussion of opinion. Mill's On Liberty, published in 1859, became a classic defence of the right to freedom of expression. Mill argued that truth drives out falsity, therefore the free expression of ideas, true or false, should not be feared. Truth is not stable or fixed but evolves with time. Mill argued that much of what we once considered true has turned out false. Therefore, views should not be prohibited for their apparent falsity. Mill also argued that free discussion is necessary to prevent the "deep slumber of a decided opinion". Discussion would drive the march of truth, and by considering false views, the basis of true views could be re-affirmed. Furthermore, Mill argued that an opinion only carries intrinsic value to the owner of that opinion, thus silencing the expression of that opinion is an injustice to a basic human right. It is generally held that for Mill, the only instance in which speech can be justifiably suppressed is to prevent harm from a clear and direct threat. Neither economic or moral implications nor the speaker's own well-being would justify suppression of speech. However Mill in On Liberty suggests the speech of pimps — instigating clients and sex workers to have sex — should be restricted. This suggests he may be willing to restrict some speech that, while not harming others, undermines their decisional autonomy.

In her 1906 biography of Voltaire, Evelyn Beatrice Hall coined the following sentence to illustrate Voltaire's beliefs: "I disapprove of what you say, but I will defend to the death your right to say it". Hall's quote is frequently cited to describe the principle of freedom of speech. Noam Chomsky stated, "If you believe in freedom of speech, you believe in freedom of speech for views you don't like. Dictators such as Stalin and Hitler, were in favor of freedom of speech for views they liked only. If you're in favor of freedom of speech, that means you're in favor of freedom of speech precisely for views you despise". Lee Bollinger argues that "the free speech principle involves a special act of carving out one area of social interaction for extraordinary self-restraint, the purpose of which is to develop and demonstrate a social capacity to control feelings evoked by a host of social encounters". Bollinger argues that tolerance is a desirable value, if not essential. However, critics argue that society should be concerned by those who directly deny or advocate, for example, genocide (see limitations above).

As chairman of the London-based PEN International, a club which defends freedom of expression and a free press, English author H. G. Wells met with Stalin in 1934 and was hopeful of reform in the Soviet Union. However, during their meeting in Moscow, Wells said, "the free expression of opinion—even of opposition opinion, I do not know if you are prepared yet for that much freedom here".

The 1928 novel Lady Chatterley's Lover by D. H. Lawrence was banned for obscenity in several countries, including the United Kingdom, the United States, Australia, Canada, and India. In the late 1950s and early 1960s, it was the subject of landmark court rulings that saw the ban for obscenity overturned. Dominic Sandbrook of The Telegraph in the UK wrote, "Now that public obscenity has become commonplace, it is hard to recapture the atmosphere of a society that saw fit to ban books such as Lady Chatterley's Lover because it was likely to 'deprave and corrupt' its readers". Fred Kaplan of The New York Times stated the overturning of the obscenity laws "set off an explosion of free speech" in the U.S. The 1960s also saw the Free Speech Movement, a massive long-lasting student protest on the campus of the University of California, Berkeley during the 1964–65 academic year.

In contrast to Anglophone nations, France was a haven for literary freedom. The innate French regard for the mind meant that France was disinclined to punish literary figures for their writing, and prosecutions were rare. While it was prohibited everywhere else, James Joyce's Ulysses was published in Paris in 1922. Henry Miller's 1934 novel Tropic of Cancer (banned in the U.S. until 1963) and Lawrence's Lady Chatterley's Lover were published in France decades before they were available in the respective authors' home countries.

In 1964 comedian Lenny Bruce was arrested in the U.S. due to complaints again about his use of various obscenities. A three-judge panel presided over his widely publicized six-month trial. He was found guilty of obscenity in November 1964. He was sentenced on 21 December 1964, to four months in a workhouse. He was set free on bail during the appeals process and died before the appeal was decided. On 23 December 2003, thirty-seven years after Bruce's death, New York Governor George Pataki granted him a posthumous pardon for his obscenity conviction.

In the United States, the right to freedom of expression has been interpreted to include the right to take and publish photographs of strangers in public areas without their permission or knowledge. This is not the case worldwide.

Offences

 
In some countries, people are not allowed to talk about certain things such as Lèse-majesté which is an offence against the dignity of a reigning sovereign or against a state. Doing so constitutes an offence. For example, Saudi Arabia is responsible for executing journalist Jamal Khashoggi in 2018. As he entered the Saudi embassy in Turkey, a team of Saudi assassins killed him. Another Saudi writer, Raif Badawi, was arrested in 2012 and lashed.

See also 

 Academic freedom
 Artistic freedom
 The Confessionals
 Cancel culture
 Civil and political rights
 Digital rights
 Election silence
 Everybody Draw Mohammed Day
 Forced or compelled speech
 Free speech fights
 Freedom of thought
 Glasnost
 Global Network Initiative
 Hate speech
 Heckler's veto
 IFEX (organization)
 Illegal number
 Investigative journalism
 Je suis Charlie
 Jyllands-Posten Muhammad cartoons controversy
 Jamal Khashoggi
 Legality of Holocaust denial
 Post–World War II legality of Nazi flags
 Strafgesetzbuch section 86a
 Verbotsgesetz 1947
 Bans on communist symbols
 Lolicon/Shotacon
 Legal status of drawn pornography depicting minors
 Simulated child pornography
 Market for loyalties theory
 Media transparency
 No Platform
 Open court principle
 Paradox of tolerance
 Parrhesia
 Photography Is Not a Crime
 Pirate Party
 Political correctness
 Rights
 Safety of journalists
 Stanley v. Georgia
 Symbolic speech
 Victimless crime

References

Further reading 
 
 
 
 
 
 
 
 
 
 Shaw, Caroline. "Freedom of expression and the palladium of British liberties, 1650–2000: A review essay". History Compass (Oct 2020). Online.

External links 

 Article19.org, global campaign for free expression
 Free Speech Debate, a research project of the Dahrendorf Programme for the Study of Freedom at St Antony's College in the University of Oxford
 Index on Censorship, an international organisation that promotes and defends the right to freedom of expression
 Media Freedom Navigator: Media Freedom Indices at a Glance, Deutsche Welle Akademie
 Special Rapporteur for Freedom of Expression, Organization of American States

 
Censorship
Speech
Human rights